Stephen Barrett Levine (born 1942) is an American psychiatrist known for his work in human sexuality, particularly sexual dysfunction and transsexualism.

Education and career
Levine earned his M.D. from Case Western Reserve University School of Medicine in 1967 and serves as a Clinical Professor of Psychiatry there. His clinical practice began in the mid-1970s as the University Hospitals of Cleveland Sexual Dysfunction Clinic. In 1993 the Clinic separated from University Hospitals, and is presently called The Center for Marital and Sexual Health in Beachwood, Ohio.

His early work focused on premature ejaculation and erectile dysfunction, and he has written on a number of treatment options, including vacuum pumps, injections into the corpus cavernosum of the penis, and Viagra. The most potent aphrodisiacs, according to Levine, are psychological intimacy and voyeurism: "looking at pictures or movies of people engaged in genital or romantic interplay."

Levine has written on sex offenders, including professionals who offend. He cites Kurt Freund as an important influence because Freund wanted to define the subtypes of child molesters to help devise a means of prevention. Levine has written about adultery and infidelity and believes pejorative terms like "cheating" and "infidelity" prevent addressing the issue in realistic terms.

He was section co-editor with R. Taylor Segraves for the section on sexual and gender identity disorders in Treatments of Psychiatric Disorders by Glen Gabbard. Notable contributors included Martin Kafka (paraphilias) and Kenneth Zucker (gender identity disorder in children and adolescents).

Although much of his work is written for other clinicians, Levine has written books for a lay audience, including Solving Common Sexual Problems (1997) and Sexuality in Mid-Life (2004).

He is noted for his work in clinical management of gender identity disorder. Levine was Chair of the fifth edition of the Harry Benjamin International Gender Dysphoria Association Standards of Care in 1998. Levine also served on the American Psychiatric Association DSM-IV Subcommittee on Gender Identity Disorders.

Work on transsexualism 

Levine has expressed skepticism towards gender transitioning for children, adolescents, and young adults. Levine also criticized a study by psychiatrist Jack Turban finding that gender dysphoria in children was not caused by social contagion, saying that the study only covers two years and uses survey data instead of clinic referral data. Furthermore, Levine alleged Turban had conflicts of interest and accused him of being "an advocate rather than a scientist."

Levine has testified in many court cases relating to transgender rights, both in the United States and abroad. Levine has strongly advocated against allowing social transition for transgender youth, describing it as setting them on a 'conveyor belt' to medical transition. He has also advocated against access to gender affirming medical care, most notably testifying in the case Bell v Tavistock, and has likened it to the medical experimentation performed by Nazi Germany during the Holocaust. He has additionally testified in favor of overturning Washington state's ban on conversion therapy.

A 2021 article in Wired Magazine described Levine's role in the American prison system, frequently being brought in to testify against allowing trans prisoners access to medical or social transition, and being used by many prisons in a clinical context to deny said measures to individual prisoners.

Selected publications

Levine SB (1975). Premature ejaculation: Some thoughts about its pathogenesis. Journal of Sex & Marital Therapy Volume 1, Issue 4 Summer 1975, pages 326 – 334.
Levine SB, Yost MA (1976). Frequency of sexual dysfunction in a general gynecological clinic: An epidemiological approach. Archives of Sexual Behavior Volume 5, Number 3 / May, 1976, 229-238.
Levine SB, Agle D (1978). The effectiveness of sex therapy for chronic secondary psychological impotence. Journal of Sex & Marital Therapy Volume 4, Issue 4 Winter 1978, pages 235 - 258
Levine SB, Yost MA (1980). Psychiatric Diagnosis Of Patients Requesting Sex Reassignment Surgery. Journal of Sex & Marital Therapy Volume 6, Issue 3 Autumn 1980, pages 164 – 173.
Levine SB, Lothstein L (1981). Transsexualism or the Gender Dysphoria Syndromes. Journal of Sex & Marital Therapy Volume 7, Issue 2 Summer 1981, pages 85 – 113.
Levine SB (1982). A Modern Perspective on Nymphomania. Journal of Sex & Marital Therapy Volume 8, Issue 4 Winter 1982, pages 316 – 324.
Levine SB, Shumaker RE (1983). Increasingly ruth: Toward understanding sex reassignment. Archives of Sexual Behavior Volume 12, Number 3 / June, 1983, 247-261.
Levine SB (1984). An essay on the nature of sexual desire. Journal of Sex & Marital Therapy Volume 10, Issue 2 Summer 1984, pages 83 – 96
Levine SB (1987). More on the nature of sexual desire. Journal of Sex & Marital Therapy Volume 13, Issue 1 Spring 1987, pages 35 – 44.
Levine SB (1989). Sex Is Not Simple. Ohio Psychology Publications. 
Turner LA, Althof SE, Levine SB, et al. (1989). Self-injection of papaverine and phentolamine in the treatment of psychogenic impotence. Journal of Sex & Marital Therapy Volume 15, Issue 3 Autumn 1989, pages 163 – 176.
Althof SE, Turner LA, Levine SB, Risen C, Kursh ED (1989). Why do so many people drop out from auto-injection therapy for impotence? Journal of Sex & Marital Therapy Volume 15, Issue 2 Summer 1989, pages 121 – 129.
Althof SE, Turner LA, Levine SB, Risen CB, Bodner D,  Kursh ED, Resnick MI (1991). Sexual, Psychological, and Marital Impact of Self-Injection of Papaverine and Phentolamine: A Long-Term Prospective Study. Journal of Sex & Marital Therapy Volume 17, Issue 2 Summer 1991, pages 101 – 112.
Bradley SJ, Blanchard R, Coates SW, Green R, Levine SB, Meyer-Bahlburg HFL, Pauly IB, Zucker KJ (1991). Interim report of the DSM-IV Subcommittee on Gender Identity Disorders. Archives of Sexual Behavior Volume 20, Number 4 / August, 1991
Levine SB (1992). Sexual Life: A Clinician's Guide. Springer 
Levine SB, ed. (1995). Clinical Sexuality (The Psychiatric Clinics of North America, Volume 18, Number 1, March 1995) W.B. Saunders Company ASIN B0014EBK6O
Levine SB (1997). Solving Common Sexual Problems: Toward a Problem-Free Sexual Life. Jason Aronson. 
Segraves RT, Levine SB (section editors) Sexual and Gender Identity Disorders. In Gabbard GO, ed. (2001). Treatments of Psychiatric Disorders.
Levine SB, Stagno SJ (2001). Informed Consent for Case Reports: The Ethical Dilemma of Right to Privacy Versus Pedagogical ... Journal of Psychotherapy Practice and Research
Levine SB (2002). Reexploring the Concept of Sexual Desire. Journal of Sex & Marital Therapy
Levine SB (2003). The Nature of Sexual Desire: A Clinician's Perspective. Archives of Sexual Behavior
Levine SB, Risen CB, Althof SE, eds. (2003). Handbook of Clinical Sexuality for Mental Health Professionals. Psychology Press 
Levine SB (2004). Sexuality in Mid-Life. Springer 
Althof SE, Leiblum SR, Chevret-Measson M, et al. (2005). Psychological and Interpersonal Dimensions of Sexual Function and Dysfunction. Journal of Sexual Medicine
Levine SB (2005). A Reintroduction to Clinical Sexuality. Focus, American Psychiatric Association
Levine SB (2006). Demystifying Love: Plain Talk for the Mental Health Professional. Brunner-Routledge

References

1942 births
Living people
American psychiatrists
Transgender studies academics